KAMQ (1240 AM) is a radio station broadcasting a mainstream rock format.  Licensed to Carlsbad, New Mexico, United States, the station serves the Carlsbad area.  The station is currently owned by KAMQ, Inc.

Previous logo

References

External links
FCC History Cards for KAMQ

AMQ